"Somethin' I'm Good At" is a song co-written and recorded by American country music artist Brett Eldredge. It was co-written with Tom Douglas and released on February 24, 2017 as the lead single from Eldredge's self-titled fourth studio album.

Background
The song was written in an hour after a five-hour session in which Eldredge worked on a ballad, and was recorded out of a desire to be spontaneous and have fun. Eldredge said of the song: "It made us write one of the craziest, out of nowhere fun songs I've ever written. I've never had so much fun recording." His ad libs and laughter were left on the final recording. Douglas and producer Ross Copperman also provided backing vocals.

Commercial performance
"Somethin' I'm Good At" peaked at number 21 on the Billboard Country Airplay chart, making it Eldredge's first single to miss the top 10 since "It Ain't Gotta Be Love" in 2011. The song has sold 135,000 copies in the US as of July 2017.

Music video
The music video for the song was directed by Ethan Lader and released on February 27, 2017. It features Eldredge dressed in a suit setting off a chain of events as he walks down a street.

Credits and personnel
Credits adapted from AllMusic.

 Dave Cohen – keyboards
 Ross Copperman – backing vocals, keyboards, programming, production, recording
 Josh Ditty – engineering
 Tom Douglas – backing vocals
 Dan Dugmore – lap steel guitar
 Brett Eldredge – lead vocals
 Fred Eltringham – drums
 David LaBruyere – bass guitar
 Justin Niebank – mixing
 Andy Skib – background vocals, acoustic guitar, electric guitar, keyboards, programming, recording
 Derek Wells – acoustic guitar, electric guitar

Charts

Weekly charts

Year-end charts

Certification and sales

References

2017 songs
2017 singles
Atlantic Records singles
Brett Eldredge songs
Songs written by Brett Eldredge
Songs written by Tom Douglas (songwriter)
Song recordings produced by Ross Copperman